Olyunin (Russian: Олюнин) is a Russian masculine surname, its feminine counterpart is Olyunina. Notable people with the surname include:

Nikolay Olyunin (born 1991), Russian snowboarder
Alevtina Olyunina (born 1942), Russian cross-country skier

Russian-language surnames